Ministry of Natural Resources was the ministry that was responsible for the natural resources of Somalia. On 17 January 2014, newly appointed Prime Minister of Somalia, Abdiweli Sheikh Ahmed split the ministerial portfolio into the Ministries of Agriculture, Mineral Resources, Fishing and Marine Resources, Environment and Livestock, and Energy and Water, respectively.

References

Somalia
Government ministries of Somalia